Edmond Malassis (14 December 1874 – 3 September 1944) was a French painter and illustrator.

Life 
Edmond Malassis was born in the 10th arrondissement of Paris on 14 December 1874. He was a pupil of Gustave Moreau, and became a watercolourist.

Malassis worked primarily in the first half of the 20th century. A prolific book illustrator, he did not do his own engravings. In 1935, he exhibited at the galerie de l'Écale in the Faubourg Saint-Honoré, Paris.

He died in his home in the 7th arrondissement of Paris on 3 September 1944, aged sixty-nine.

Illustrated works 

 Edmond Haraucourt, La Légende des sexes. Poèmes hystériques (Brussels, 1882)
 Balzac, La Belle Impéria (Paris: Louis Conard, 1903)
 Théodore de Banville, Gringoire, comedy in one act, in prose (Paris: Louis Conard, 1904)
 André Couvreur, Caresco surhomme, ou le voyage en Eucrasie, conte humain (Paris: Plon, 1904)
 Balzac, Les joyeuzetés du roy Loys le Unzième (Paris: Louis Conard, 1907)
 Erckmann-Chatrian, L'Ami Fritz (Paris: Louis Conard, 1909)
 Pierre Louÿs, Aphrodite, Mœurs antiques (Paris: M. H. Couderc de Saint-Chamant, 1910) 
 The original copy was illustrated by Claude-Charles Bourgonnier and Adolphe Giraldon. Malassis illustrated two copies.
 Anatole France, Le Crime de Sylvestre Bonnard (Paris: Carteret, 1921)
 Guy de Maupassant, La Morte (Paris, 1922)
 A unique copy illustrated with original watercolours.
 Voltaire, Candide (Paris: Carteret, 1922)
 Charles Baudelaire, Amoenitates Belgicae, epigrams published by François Montel (Paris: Éditions Excelsior, 1925)
 Stendhal, L'Abbesse de Castro (Paris: Javal et Bourdeaux, 1930)
 Copper-engraved by Delzers and Feltesse.
 La Fontaine, Fables choisies (Paris: Louis Connard, 1930–1933)
 Illustrated by Fred Money, woodcuts in colours by André and Paul Baudier, decorative compositions by Pierre Laprade.
 Louis XI (attribution), Les Cent Nouvelles (Paris: P. Javal and Bourdeaux, 1931) 
 Originally engraved on copper by Lorrain.
 Brantôme, Les Vies des dames galantes (Paris: Le Vasseur et Cie, 1935)
 Théodore de Banville, Florise (Paris: A. and F. Ferroud, 1936)
 Richard Wagner, La Tétralogie, translated by Albert Pauphilet (Paris: Piazza, 1941)
 Joseph Bédier (adaptation), Le Roman de Tristan et Iseut (Paris: Piazza, 1942)
 Frontispiece and ornamentation.

References

Citations

Bibliography 

 Oliver, Valerie Cassel, ed. (2011). "Malassis, Edmond". In Benezit Dictionary of Artists. Oxford University Press.
 Osterwalder, Marcus, ed. (1992). "Malassis, Edmond". In Dictionnaire des illustrateurs, 1890–1945. Ides et Calendes.
 "Edmond Malassis (1874-1944)". (18 January 2022). Bibliothèque nationale de France. BnF Data. Retrieved 29 March 2022.

External links 

 Brodu, Jean-Louis, ed. (2003). "Caresco surhomme". Anticipations Anciennes. Retrieved 29 March 2022.
 Semenov, Aleksandr, ed. (8 February 2014). "Vies des dames galantes". Book Graphics. Retrieved 29 March 2022.

1874 births
1944 deaths
20th-century French artists
20th-century French illustrators